Richard Arauner (19 April 1902 in Solnhofen – 1 November 1936 near Tabarz) was an Oberführer in the Schutzstaffel (SS) and agricultural functionary.

Richard Arauner was born into an Evangelical quarry owner family and completed his farmer-diploma. In 1923 he joined the Freikorps Oberland and participated in the Beer Hall Putsch in Munich. On May 1, 1933 Arauner became a member of the Nazi Party and on October 1, 1933 he joined the SS. Since 1931, Arauner was Chief of the Office of Agricultural Policy. Furthermore, he was a member of the German Reich Farm Council. Since his entry into the SS, he became officer in the SS Race and Settlement Main Office (RuSHA). Arauner rose through the ranks, from Obersturmführer to finally Oberführer.

On November 1, 1936 he died in a plane crash on the way back from the inauguration of the Farmers Council of Landesbauernschaft Saar-Pfalz. Arauner was buried in Goslar.

References 

1902 births
1936 deaths
Nazis who participated in the Beer Hall Putsch
SS-Oberführer
Victims of aviation accidents or incidents in Germany
Victims of aviation accidents or incidents in 1936